Amigo de nadie is a 2019 Colombian drama film directed by Luis Alberto Restrepo based on the 2012 book titled Para matar a un amigo by Juan José Gaviria and Simón Ospina. The film premiered on 7 November 2019 in Colombia, and it
stars Juan Pablo Urrego as the titular character.

Plot 
The plot revolves around Julián (Juan Pablo Urrego), a young man from a wealthy family in the convulsed Medellin, Colombia of the 80s and 90s. Julián grows up admiring his grandfather's power and playing hide and seek with weapons, fun that can be innocent until, when he grows up and having returned from the United States, all those games become a nightmare.

Cast 
 Juan Pablo Urrego as Julián
 Catalina García
 Germán Jaramillo
 Patricia Tamayo

References

External links 
 

Colombian drama films
2019 drama films
2010s Spanish-language films
2010s Colombian films